The 2003 World Aesthetic Gymnastics Championships, the 4th edition of the Aesthetic group gymnastics competition, was held in Graz, Austria from May 23 to 24.

Medal winners

References

External links
http://www.ifagg.com
https://ifagg.sporttisaitti.com/

World Aesthetic Gymnastics Championships
International gymnastics competitions hosted by Austria 
2003 in gymnastics
Sport in Graz
2003 in Austrian sport